Cordale Flott (born August 24, 2001) is an American football cornerback for the New York Giants of the National Football League (NFL). He played college football at LSU.

Early life and high school
Flott grew up in Saraland, Alabama and attended Saraland High School. He was rated a three-star recruit and initially committed to play college football at Auburn. Flott later decommitted and signed to play at LSU.

College career

Flott played in 14 of LSU's games with one start as a freshman and had 15 tackles and four passes defended as the Tigers won the 2020 College Football Playoff National Championship. He became a starter going into his sophomore year and finished the season with 43 tackles, 4.5 tackles for loss, four passes broken up and one forced fumble. As a junior, Flott played in 11 games with 10 starts and had 41 tackles, four passes defended, and one interception. After the season, he announced that he would forgo his remaining collegiate eligibility and enter the 2022 NFL Draft.

Professional career

Flott was drafted by the New York Giants with the 81st pick in the third round of the 2022 NFL Draft.

References

External links
 New York Giants bio
 LSU Tigers bio

Living people
Players of American football from Alabama
American football cornerbacks
LSU Tigers football players
New York Giants players
People from Mobile County, Alabama
2001 births